Pitta (stylized as "Vol. 8 - PITTA") is the eighth studio album by South Korean singer Baek Ji-young. The singer stated that the album was named after a bird species known for its colorful plummage, Pitta.

Track listing
List of tracks:

Charting

Release history

References

External links 
 Hanteo Profile
 MelOn profile

2011 albums
Pop albums by South Korean artists
Kakao M albums
Warner Music Group albums